Franz Schubert's Wiegenlied "Schlafe, schlafe, holder süßer Knabe", D 498, Op. 98, No. 2, is a lullaby composed in November 1816. The song is also known as "Mille cherubini in coro" after an Italian language arrangement for voice and orchestra by Alois Melichar.

Lyrics
The author of the lyrics is unknown; they are sometimes attributed to Matthias Claudius, but the poem does not appear in Claudius' collected works.

Music

Related works
Alois Melichar arranged Wiegenlied along with incidental music from Schubert's opera Rosamunde to form the song "Mille cherubini in coro" for the 1935 film Vergiß mein nicht. It was performed by the tenor Beniamino Gigli with the Berlin State Opera Orchestra.

In more recent times the song was notably sung by tenor Luciano Pavarotti, usually in his Christmas concerts.

References

Further reading

External links
Scores
International Music Score Library Project
Indiana University Sheet Music

Recordings
Allmusic.com
ClassicalArchives.com

1816 songs
Lieder composed by Franz Schubert
Lullabies